The Parkersburg Bridge crosses the Ohio River between Parkersburg, West Virginia, and Belpre, Ohio. Designed by Jacob Linville, the bridge has 46 spans: 25 deck plate girder, 14 deck truss, 6 through truss, and 1 through plate girder.  of stone were used for the 53 piers. The bridge was constructed from May 1869 to January 1871 by the Baltimore and Ohio Railroad.

The approach spans were replaced 1898–1900, and the river spans were replaced 1904–1905.  The original piers were retained.  The steel structure atop the piers was rebuilt between about 1914 and 1917. One channel span was replaced in 1972 after a barge transporting an empty gasoline tanker exploded under the bridge.

The bridge was a part of the B&O's Baltimore – St. Louis mainline and offered the railroad easy access to Ohio in transporting coal and other materials to the east coast.  Currently the bridge handles the traffic of the Belpre Industrial Parkersburg Railroad. 

It was listed on the National Register of Historic Places in 1982 under the name Sixth Street Railroad Bridge. At the time of the listing, the bridge was still owned by the Baltimore and Ohio Railroad.

See also
List of bridges documented by the Historic American Engineering Record in Ohio
List of bridges documented by the Historic American Engineering Record in West Virginia
List of crossings of the Ohio River

References

 Track Chart, August 1947; Baltimore & Ohio System, Eastern Region, Monongah Division, Office of the Chief Engineer

External links

Railroad bridges in Ohio
Railroad bridges in West Virginia
Buildings and structures in Parkersburg, West Virginia
Parkersburg, West Virginia
Buildings and structures in Washington County, Ohio
National Register of Historic Places in Washington County, Ohio
Baltimore and Ohio Railroad bridges
Bridges completed in 1871
Bridges over the Ohio River
Transportation in Wood County, West Virginia
Historic American Engineering Record in West Virginia
Historic American Engineering Record in Ohio
Railroad bridges on the National Register of Historic Places in West Virginia
Railroad bridges on the National Register of Historic Places in Ohio
National Register of Historic Places in Wood County, West Virginia
Steel bridges in the United States
Plate girder bridges in the United States
1871 establishments in West Virginia
1871 establishments in Ohio
Interstate railroad bridges in the United States